Rapex may refer to:

 Rapid Exchange of Information System, EU rapid alert system for dangerous consumer products
 Anti-rape device, devices invented for the purpose of preventing or deterring rape